Zhong Xuechun (born January 18, 1994) is a Chinese freestyle wrestler. She competed in the women's freestyle 53 kg event at the 2016 Summer Olympics, in which she lost the bronze medal match to Sofia Mattsson.

In 2015, she competed in the women's freestyle 53 kg event at the 2015 World Wrestling Championships held in Las Vegas, United States.

References

External links
 

1994 births
Living people
Chinese female sport wrestlers
Olympic wrestlers of China
Wrestlers at the 2016 Summer Olympics
Asian Games bronze medalists for China
Wrestlers at the 2014 Asian Games
Asian Games medalists in wrestling
Medalists at the 2014 Asian Games
21st-century Chinese women